Martin Dubina (born October 2, 1987) is a Slovak professional ice hockey player who played with HC Slovan Bratislava in the Slovak Extraliga.

References

Living people
HC Slovan Bratislava players
Slovak ice hockey centres
1987 births
Ice hockey people from Bratislava